This is a list of seasons completed by the Duquesne Dukes men's college basketball team.

Seasons

Notes

Duquesne Dukes
Duquesne Dukes men's basketball seasons
Duquesne Dukes basketball seasons